The Internal Revenue Code (IRC), formally the Internal Revenue Code of 1986, is the domestic portion of federal statutory tax law in the United States, published in various volumes of the United States Statutes at Large, and separately as Title 26 of the United States Code (USC). It is organized topically, into subtitles and sections, covering income tax in the United States, payroll taxes, estate taxes, gift taxes, and excise taxes; as well as procedure and administration. The Code's implementing federal agency is the Internal Revenue Service.

Origins of tax codes in the United States 
Prior to 1874, U.S. statutes (whether in tax law or other subjects) were not codified. That is, the acts of Congress were not separately organized and published in separate volumes based on the subject matter (such as taxation, bankruptcy, etc.). Codifications of statutes, including tax statutes, undertaken in 1873 resulted in the Revised Statutes of the United States, approved June 22, 1874, effective for the laws in force as of December 1, 1873. Title 35 of the Revised Statutes was the Internal revenue title. Another codification was undertaken in 1878.

In 1919, a committee of the U.S. House of Representatives began a project to recodify U.S. statutes, which eventually resulted in a new United States Code in 1926 (including tax statutes).

Internal Revenue Code of 1939 
The tax statutes were re-codified by an Act of Congress on February 10, 1939 as the "Internal Revenue Code" (later known as the "Internal Revenue Code of 1939"). The 1939 Code was published as volume 53, Part I, of the United States Statutes at Large and as title 26 of the United States Code. Subsequent permanent tax laws enacted by the United States Congress updated and amended the 1939 Code.

Internal Revenue Code of 1954 
On August 16, 1954, in connection with a general overhaul of the Internal Revenue Service, the IRC was greatly reorganized by the 83rd United States Congress and expanded (by Chapter 736). Ward M. Hussey was the principal drafter of the Internal Revenue Code of 1954. The code was published in volume 68A of the United States Statutes at Large. To prevent confusion with the 1939 Code, the new version was thereafter referred to as the "Internal Revenue Code of 1954" and the prior version as the "Internal Revenue Code of 1939". The lettering and numbering of subtitles, sections, etc., was completely changed. For example, section 22 of the 1939 Code (defining gross income) was roughly analogous to section 61 of the 1954 Code. The 1954 Code replaced the 1939 Code as title 26 of the United States Code.

The 1954 Code temporarily extended the Revenue Act of 1951's 5 percentage point increase in corporate tax rates through March 31, 1955, increased depreciation deductions by providing additional depreciation schedules, and created a 4 percent dividend tax credit for individuals.

Relationship to Title 26 of the United States Code 
The Internal Revenue Code of 1954 was enacted in the form of a separate code by act of August 16, 1954, ch. 736, . The Tax Reform Act of 1986 changed the name of the 1954 Code to the "Internal Revenue Code of 1986". In addition to being published in various volumes of the United States Statutes at Large, the Internal Revenue Code is separately published as Title 26 of the United States Code. The text of the Internal Revenue Code as published in title 26 of the U.S. Code is virtually identical to the Internal Revenue Code as published in the various volumes of the United States Statutes at Large. Of the 50 enacted titles, the Internal Revenue Code is the only volume that has been published in the form of a separate code.

Progressivity of the 1954 Code 
With respect to the federal income tax on individuals, the 1954 Code imposed a progressive tax with 24 income brackets applying to tax rates ranging from 20% to 91%. For example, the following is a schedule showing the federal marginal income tax rate imposed on each level of taxable income of a single (unmarried) individual under the 1954 Code:

 Source: Internal Revenue Code of 1954,  (modified from text of the statute).
 Relative GDP: 37.5
 Source: Bureau of Economic Analysis historical GDP tables

Internal Revenue Code of 1986 
References to the Internal Revenue Code in the United States Code and other statutes of Congress subsequent to 1954 generally mean Title 26 of the Code as amended. The basic structure of the Title 26 remained the same until the enactment of the comprehensive revision contained in Tax Reform Act of 1986, although of course individual provisions of the law were changed on a regular basis.

Section 2 of the Tax Reform Act of 1986 provides (in part):
(a) Redesignation of 1954 Code. – The Internal Revenue Title enacted August 16, 1954, as heretofore, hereby, or hereafter amended, may be cited as the "Internal Revenue Code of 1986".
(b) References in Laws, Etc. – Except when inappropriate, any reference in any law, Executive order, or other document –
(1) to the Internal Revenue Code of 1954 shall include a reference to the Internal Revenue Code of 1986, and
(2) to the Internal Revenue Code of 1986 shall include a reference to the provisions of law formerly known as the Internal Revenue Code of 1954.

Thus, the 1954 Code was renamed the Internal Revenue Code of 1986 by section 2 of the Tax Reform Act of 1986. The 1986 Act contained substantial amendments, but no formal re-codification. That is, the 1986 Code retained most of the same lettering and numbering of subtitles, chapters, subchapters, parts, subparts, sections, etc. The 1986 Code, as amended from time to time (and still published as title 26 of the United States Code), retains the basic structure of the 1954 Code.

Commonly misunderstood special definitions 
 Employee
 Wages
 Many others can be found at https://www.law.cornell.edu/uscode/text/26/3401

Individual and corporate income tax
Section 1 of the Internal Revenue Code imposes the federal income tax on the taxable income of U.S. citizens and residents, and of estates and trusts. The corporate income tax is imposed by Internal Revenue Code section 11.

Organization 

The organization of the Internal Revenue Code, as enacted in hundreds of Public Laws passed by the U.S. Congress since 1954, is identical to the organization of the Internal Revenue Code separately published as Title 26 of the U.S. Code.

For example, section 162(e)(4)(B)(ii) (26 U.S.C. ) would be as follows:  

Title 26: Internal Revenue Code
 Subtitle A: Income Taxes
 : Normal Taxes and Surtaxes
 : Computation of Taxable Income
 Part VI: Itemized Deductions for Individuals and Corporations
 : Trade or business expenses
 Subsection (e): Denial of deduction for certain lobbying and political expenditures
 Paragraph (4): Other special rules
 Sub-paragraph (B)): De minimis exception
 Clause (ii): In-house expenditures

The Internal Revenue Code is topically organized and generally referred to by section number (sections 1 through 9834). Some topics are short (e.g., tax rates) and some quite long (e.g., pension & benefit plans).

Key IRC Topics By Section:

Subtitles 
 A. Income Taxes (sections 1 through 1564)As a further example, here are the chapters of this subtitle:
  (sections 1 through 1400U3)
  (sections 1401 through 1403)
  (sections 1441 through 1464)
  (sections 1471–1474)
  (sections 1491-1494)
  (sections 1501 through 1564)
 B. Estate and Gift Taxes (sections 2001 through 2801)
 C. Employment Taxes (sections 3101 through 3510)
 D. Miscellaneous Excise Taxes (sections 4001 through 5000)
 E. Alcohol, Tobacco, and Certain Other Excise Taxes (sections 5001 through 5891)
 F. Procedure and Administration (sections 6001 through 7874)
 G. The Joint Committee on Taxation (sections 8001 through 8023)
 H. Financing of Presidential Election Campaigns (sections 9001 through 9042)
 I. Trust Fund Code (sections 9500 through 9602) ("Trust Fund Code of 1981")
 J. Coal Industry Health Benefits (sections 9701 through 9722)
 K. Group Health Plan Requirements (sections 9801 through 9834)

List of commonly referenced sections 
(This is not intended to be a complete list of sections.)

 Subtitle A: Income Taxes (–)
 : Normal Taxes and Surtaxes (–)
 Subchapter A: Determination of Tax Liability (–)
 Part I: Tax on Individuals (–)
 Section 1: Tax imposed
 ...
 Section 41: Credit for increasing research activities
 ...
 Subchapter B: Computation of Taxable Income (–)
 Part I: Definition of Gross Income, Adjusted Gross Income, Taxable Income, Etc. (–)
 Section 61: Gross income defined
 ...
 Section 63: Taxable income defined
 ...
 Part II: Items Specifically Included in Gross Income (–)
 ...
 Section 79: Group-term life insurance purchased for employees
 ...
 Part III: Items Specifically Excluded from Gross Income (–)
 ...
 Section 132(a): Fringe benefits excluded from gross income
 ...
 Part VI: Itemized Deductions for Individuals and Corporations (–)
 ...
 Section 162(2): Trade or business expenses
 ...
 Section 179: Election to expense certain depreciable business assets
 ...
 Section 183: Activities Not Engaged in for Profit
 ...
 Part VII: Additional Itemized Deductions for Individuals (–)
 ...
 Section 212: Expenses for production of income
 ...
 Subchapter C: Corporate Distributions and Adjustments (–)
 ...
 Part III: Corporate Organizations and Reorganizations (–)
 ...
 Subpart B: Effects on Shareholders and Security Holders (–)
 ...
 Section 355: Distribution of stock and securities of a controlled corporation
 ...
 ...
 Subchapter D: Deferred Compensation, Etc. (–)
 Part I: Pension, Profit-sharing, Stock Bonus Plas, etc. (–)
 Subpart A: General Rule (–)
 Section 401: Qualified pension, profit-sharing, and stock bonus plans
 paragraph (a) ("401(a)"): employer-sponsored retirement plan for employees of state and local governments and certain tax-exempt entities
 ...
 paragraph (k) ("401(k)"): employer-sponsored retirement plan
 ...
 Section 402A ("Roth 401(k)"): Optional treatment of elective deferrals as Roth contributions
 Section 403: Taxation of employee annuities
 ...
 paragraph (b) ("403(b)"): employer-sponsored retirement plan at non-profit organizations
 ...
 Section 408: Individual Retirement Accounts
 Section 408A: Roth IRAs
 ...
 Section 409A: Inclusion in gross income of deferred compensation under nonqualified deferred compensation plans
 ...
 Subchapter E: Accounting Periods and Methods of Accounting (–)
 ...
 Part II: Methods of Accounting (–)
 Subpart B: Taxable Year for Which Items of Gross Income Included (–)
 ...
 Section 457: retirement plan for governmental and certain non governmental employers
 ...
 Subpart D: Inventories (–)
 ...
 Section 475: Mark to market accounting method for dealers in securities
 ...
 Subchapter F: Exempt Organizations (–)
 Part I: General Rule (–)
 Section 501: Exemption from tax on corporations, certain trusts, etc.
 ...
 paragraph (c) ("501(c)"): List of exempt organizations
 subparagraph (1) ("501(c)(1)"): corporations organized under Acts of Congress such as Federal Credit Unions
 subparagraph (2) ("501(c)(2)"): title-holding corporations for exempt organizations
 subparagraph (3) ("501(c)(3)"): charitable, non-profit, religious, and educational organizations
 subparagraph (4) ("501(c)(4)"): political education organizations
 subparagraph (6) ("501(c)(6)"): business leagues and chambers of commerce
 subparagraph (7) ("501(c)(7)"): recreational clubs
 ...
 Part VI: Political Organizations (§ 527)
 Section 527: Political organizations
 ...
 Part VIII: Certain Savings Entities (–)
 Section 529: Qualified tuition programs
 Section 529A: ABLE accounts for benefit of certain individuals with disabilities
 Section 530: Coverdell Education Savings Accounts
 ...
 Subchapter N: Tax Based on Income From Sources Within or Without the United States (–)
 Part I: Source Rules and Other General Rules Relating To Foreign Income (–)
 Section 861: Income from sources within the United States
 ...
 Subchapter O: Gain or Loss on Disposition of Property (–)
 ...
 Part III: Common Nontaxable Exchanges (–)
 Section 1031: Exchange of property held for productive use or investment
 ...
 Section 1041: Transfers of Property Between Spouses or Incident to Divorce
 ...
 Subtitle C: Employment Taxes (–)
 ...
 : Collection of Income Tax at Source on Wages (–)
 Section 3401: Definitions

See also
Mazzei v. Commissioner
Turner v. Commissioner
SECURE Act of 2019
Estate of Carter v. Commissioner
Boechler v. Commissioner

References

External links 
 U.S. Code Title 26, via United States Government Printing Office
 Title 26 at Cornell's Legal Information Institute
 Bloomberg Tax Internal Revenue Code continuously updated with Editor's Notes